The 1921–22 Toronto St. Patricks season was the fifth season of the Toronto NHL franchise, third as the St. Patricks. The St. Patricks would win the NHL championship and the Stanley Cup.

Regular season

Prior to the season, St. Pats goaltender Jake Forbes was denied a pay raise, and he refused to play with the team for the 1921–22 season.  Toronto suspended Forbes from the club, and signed free agent goaltender John Ross Roach.

The St. Pats played consistent hockey all season long, finishing the season with a 13–10–1, earning 27 points, and finishing in second place in the league, behind the Senators, and once again earned a spot in the O'Brien Cup finals.

Babe Dye led the St. Pats with 30 goals, two less than league leader Punch Broadbent of the Ottawa Senators, and his 37 points was the third highest in the NHL, behind Broadbent and Senators teammate Cy Denneny.  Harry Cameron scored 19 goals and 27 points from the blueline, while Corbett Denneny also scored 19 goals and earned 26 points in total.  Reg Noble had another solid season, scoring 17 goals and 25 points, while Ken Randall also got into double digits with goals, scoring 10.  Denneny led the club with 28 penalty minutes, with Randall just behind him, getting 20 penalty minutes.

In goal, John Ross Roach had a solid rookie season, playing in 22 games, finishing with a record of 11–10–1, and a GAA of 4.07.

The St. Pats met the Ottawa Senators in the two game, total goal O'Brien Cup finals.  Ottawa upset Toronto the previous year, however this season, Toronto was the underdog, as they finished 3 points behind the Senators in the NHL standings.  The St. Pats defeated the Senators in the first game held at Mutual Street Arena by a score of 5–4.  The series moved to Dey's Arena in Ottawa for the second game, and the St. Pats used the strategy of icing the puck whenever possible in this game to keep their lead, and it worked, as the teams played to a 0–0 tie, as Toronto advanced to the Stanley Cup finals, winning the series 5–4.

Toronto faced the Vancouver Millionaires of the PCHA to determine the winner of the 1922 Stanley Cup Finals in a best of 5 series, with all games being played at Mutual Street Arena.  Vancouver took a 1–0 series lead, defeating Toronto 4–3, however, Babe Dye scored in overtime in the second game, evening the series to one win a piece.  Vancouver took a 2–1 series lead, defeating the St. Pats 3–0 in the third game.  The Millionaires looked to end the series in the fourth game, however, John Ross Roach shutout Vancouver 6–0, setting up a Stanley Cup deciding fifth game.  The St. Pats, led by Babe Dye and his four goals, easily defeated Vancouver 5–1, as the Toronto franchise won the Stanley Cup for the second time in team history.

Season standings

Record vs. opponents

Schedule and results

Regular season

Playoffs

Toronto St. Pats 5, Ottawa Senators 4

Toronto St. Pats 3, Vancouver Millionaires 2

Player statistics

Regular season
Scoring

Goaltending

Playoffs
Scoring

Goaltending

Awards and records
 O'Brien Cup – NHL league champions

Transactions
 November 9, 1921: Traded Cully Wilson to Hamilton Tigers for Ed Carpenter
 December 5, 1921: Lost Free Agent Ivan Mitchell to Hamilton Tigers
 December 16, 1921: Signed Free Agent Glenn Smith
 December 23, 1921: Signed Free Agents Paddy Nolan, Stan Jackson and Ted Stackhouse
 January 22, 1922: Released Ted Stackhouse
 January 25, 1922: Signed Free Agent Ted Stackhouse
 May 27, 1922: Traded Jake Forbes to Hamilton Tigers for cash

See also
 1921–22 NHL season

References

Sources
 SHRP Sports
 The Internet Hockey Database
 Rauzulu's Street
 Goalies Archive
 National Hockey League Guide & Record Book 2007

Stanley Cup championship seasons
Toronto St. Patricks seasons
Toronto
Toronto
1922 Stanley Cup